Robert James Gaiters (born February 26, 1938) is an American former National Football League player.

Gaiters attended Santa Ana Junior College, and transferred to New Mexico State University in 1959. He was a star player on its Aggies football team. A fast tailback weighing over two hundred pounds, Gaiters helped lead the Aggies during their undefeated season in 1960, and claimed the collegiate national championships in rushing and scoring.

He was drafted by the Denver Broncos in the 1961 American Football League Draft and by the New York Giants in the 1961 NFL Draft.  He played two seasons in the NFL, spending time with the Giants and San Francisco 49ers. Gaiters spent the 1963 season with the Broncos of the AFL. He then played for the Hamilton Tiger-Cats of the Canadian Football League in 1964.

Gaiters finished his career in the Continental Football League where he played for the Newark Bears in 1965, the Hartford Charter Oaks in 1966 and the Orange County Ramblers in 1967.

See also
 List of NCAA major college football yearly rushing leaders
 List of NCAA major college football yearly scoring leaders

References

1938 births
Living people
Sportspeople from Zanesville, Ohio
Players of American football from Ohio
American football halfbacks
American Football League first overall draft picks
New Mexico State Aggies football players
New York Giants players
Hamilton Tiger-Cats players
Continental Football League players
San Francisco 49ers players